Olga Antonova may refer to:
 Olga Antonova (athlete) (born 1960), Russian sprinter
 Olga Antonova (actress) (born 1937), Russian actress